Martin Lavut (December 18, 1934 – January 26, 2016) was a Canadian filmmaker born in Montreal, Quebec. He wrote and directed numerous theatrical and television dramas, and documentary films. Among his dramas are the films Certain Practices, War Brides, Charlie Grant's War and The Marriage Bed. His documentaries include At Home, Without a Hobby It’s No Life, Orillia, and After Darwin. In 2006, he directed Remembering Arthur, a biography of filmmaker Arthur Lipsett.

In 2010 he completed a documentary about the eccentric portrait photographer Mike Disfarmer which premiered on TVOntario.

As a voice actor he is best known for his contributions to early Nelvana productions, such as The Devil and Daniel Mouse and its spin-off, Rock & Rule. He studied acting at California's Pasadena Playhouse, and New York's American Theatre Wing. He acted with Compass/Second City’s Saint Louis Company. Mr. Lavut died in Toronto, Ontario, Canada.

Filmography

References

External links

1934 births
2016 deaths
Anglophone Quebec people
Canadian male voice actors
Film directors from Montreal
Male actors from Montreal
Canadian television directors